John William Cummings (April 1, 1904 in Pittsburgh, Pennsylvania – October 5, 1962 in West Mifflin, Pennsylvania), was a Major League Baseball player who played catcher for the Boston Braves and New York Giants from  to .

In 89 games over 4 seasons, Cummings posted a .341 batting average (45-for-132) with 15 runs, 4 home runs and 28 RBI.

External links

1904 births
1962 deaths
Major League Baseball catchers
Boston Braves players
New York Giants (NL) players
Baseball players from Pittsburgh